The pallid spinetail (Cranioleuca pallida) is a species of bird in the family Furnariidae. It is endemic to Brazil.

Its natural habitat is subtropical or tropical moist montane forest.

References

pallid spinetail
Birds of the Atlantic Forest
Endemic birds of Brazil
pallid spinetail
Taxonomy articles created by Polbot